Plymouth High School is located in Plymouth, Ohio and is part of the Plymouth-Shiloh Local School District. Plymouth High School is a standard Ohio High School offering many different classes to meet class requirements for graduation along with several different sports teams and clubs.

The school's principal is Joe Morabito. School colors are red, white, and black. Plymouth High School has the nickname "Big Red" and a  Viking is their mascot.  They are members of the Firelands Conference.

In 1957, Plymouth consolidated their district with New Haven to create Huron Valley High School.  The Ohio Supreme Court voided the merger in February 1958, and the schools immediately split apart.  Eventually, just in time for the 1958–59 school year, Plymouth's school district merged with Shiloh's school district, and Plymouth High School began taking in Shiloh's students.

State championships

 Boys Cross Country – 1971, 1974

References

External links
 

High schools in Richland County, Ohio
Public high schools in Ohio